This list of tallest buildings in Christchurch ranks high-rise buildings in Christchurch, New Zealand by height.

The first high-rise was Manchester Courts, which was the city's tallest building from 1906 until 1967. Manchester Courts was demolished following the 2010 Canterbury earthquake. Six more buildings have held the title of tallest building in Christchurch. Most of the high-rises were demolished following the February 2011 Christchurch earthquake making it the worst single event for high rise destruction in history.

Of the 54 buildings in the list before the earthquakes, 18 are to remain, and 36 have already been demolished.

Background
This includes spires and architectural details and include antenna masts.

Manchester Courts, earlier known as the MLC Building, was the city's first commercial high-rise building. Built in 1905–1906 for the New Zealand Express Company, it was at the time the tallest commercial building in Christchurch. A Category I heritage building since 1991, it suffered serious structural damage in the 2010 Canterbury earthquake and was condemned to be demolished. Demolition began on 19 October 2010, and was completed in February 2011.
The BNZ Building in Cathedral Square has one of the oldest histories of the buildings listed here, as it replaced the earlier BNZ Building from 1866. The replacement was begun in 1961 as a four-storey building designed by Christchurch architect G. W. Bucknell. Work ceased abruptly in 1963, when the bank announced that they would redevelop the whole site (which included the removal of the historic bank building) and incorporate the four-storey building into the high-rise.

Since 2007 only three high-rises have been constructed in Christchurch: the HSBC Tower designed by Weirwalker Architecture in Worcester Boulevard, the Novotel Hotel in the Square, and Pacific Tower in Gloucester Street. All three buildings survived the earthquakes. The HSBC Tower, which first opened in 2009, was the first high-rise to open again after the February 2011 earthquake, with the first tenants moving back in on 30 May 2011. The Canterbury Earthquake Recovery Authority later moved into the top floors of the building, with CEO Roger Sutton's office the "highest office in town". Pacific Tower, which houses apartments and the Rendezvous Hotel, was repaired and reopened on 1 May 2013. The Novotel Hotel was repaired and reopened on 19 August 2013.

Radio Network House, a 14-storey building in Worcester Street that was finished in 1986, was imploded on 5 August 2012 and was New Zealand's first ever controlled building demolition by explosives.

The Clarendon Tower was built on the site of the former Clarendon Hotel and kept most of the historic hotel's façade, which was the first example of facadism in Christchurch. Designed by Warren and Mahoney, the high-rise was constructed in 1986/87.

In three high-rises, internal staircases collapsed and occupants were trapped: Hotel Grand Chancellor, Forsyth Barr House, and Clarendon Tower. The staircase failures in the Grand Chancellor and the Clarendon Tower were only partial, whilst both staircases in the Forsyth Barr House collapsed from the 14th floor down.  The Forsyth Barr House was sold "as is where is" in August 2014 to a local consortium who converted it into a 4.5 star hotel.

Lists

Colour key

Tallest buildings

Tallest buildings prior to the February 2011 earthquake

Proposed buildings

Timeline of tallest buildings
This is a list of the history of the tallest buildings in Christchurch, showing those buildings that once held the title of tallest building in chronological order.

See also
List of tallest structures in New Zealand
List of tallest buildings in Auckland
List of tallest buildings in Wellington
Twinkle Toes
List of tallest buildings in Oceania

References

Buildings and structures in Christchurch
Christchurch

2011 Christchurch earthquake